Techno India Group Public School is a chain of well-developed schools in West Bengal and beyond. Its headquarters is in Salt Lake, Kolkata. It has over 18 branches all over West Bengal and 2 branches in Madhya Pradesh. It has over 2000 students in each school. The schools are affiliated to Central Board of Secondary Education and West Bengal Council of Higher Secondary Education. These schools are mainly English medium schools, which are divided into two groups, viz. North Bengal & South Bengal Zone. The schools are affiliated up to Class XII.

Branches Of TIGPS

References

Co-educational boarding schools
High schools and secondary schools in West Bengal
Educational institutions established in 2008
2008 establishments in West Bengal